Lieutenant-General Sir Thomas McMahon, 2nd Baronet (1779–1860) was a British Army officer.

Family
He was the youngest son of John MacMahon, comptroller of the Port of Limerick, and his second wife Mary Stackpoole, daughter of James Stackpoole. He had a full brother, Sir William MacMahon, 1st Baronet, Master of the Rolls in Ireland, and an elder half-brother, Sir John McMahon, 1st Baronet, Private Secretary to the Prince Regent from 1811 to 1817. He had at least one sister, who married a Mr O'Halloran: her daughter, whose first name is uncertain, was the first wife of the writer and politician Richard Lalor Sheil. She died in childbirth in 1822.

While Thomas and William were both gifted men, their early careers were hampered by their relatively humble social origins, and there is little doubt that their half-brother's political influence greatly assisted them in their rise to prominence.

John was the first of the McMahon Baronets of Ashley Manor: on his death in 1817, the title passed to Thomas by special remainder.

He married Emily Westropp, daughter of Michael Roberts Westropp of Sunvile, County Limerick (not to be confused with his grandson, Sir Michael Roberts Westropp) and Jane Godsell, and they had nine children, including General Sir Thomas Westropp McMahon, 3rd Baronet.

Military career
McMahon served in the Portuguese army in the Peninsular War and became adjutant-general in India. He went on to be Lieutenant-Governor of Portsmouth and General Officer Commanding South-West District in 1834 and became Commander-in-chief of the Bombay Army on 14 February 1840 retiring from that post on 8 April 1847.

References

|-
 

|-

|-

1779 births
1860 deaths
Commanders-in-chief of Bombay
Royal Lincolnshire Regiment officers
Baronets in the Baronetage of the United Kingdom
British Army lieutenant generals
British Army personnel of the Peninsular War